Black & Blue is the fourth studio album (third in the United States) by American boy band Backstreet Boys. It was released on November 21, 2000, by Jive Records. The album recorded the best international sales in a week for an album in history by selling over 5 million copies in its first week of sales globally. In the United States, Black & Blue sold 1.5 million copies in its first week of release, making the Backstreet Boys the first group in Soundscan history to have million-plus first-week sales with back-to-back albums. It sold over 15 million copies worldwide.

The first single from the album was "Shape of My Heart", followed by "The Call", and "More than That". The band members wrote two songs and co-wrote five songs on this album, a departure from previous albums, which showcased less of their own song-writing. To promote the album, the band embarked on the Black & Blue World Tour in 2001.

Background
The album was recorded from July 1, 2000 to September 2000. In August 2000, the band gave fans their first glimpse of the album, including the track "It's True" on a series of CDs made available through Burger King. Backstreet Boys member AJ McLean stated that it would incorporate genres of rock, R&B, hip-hop, and country. He also revealed that Nick Carter and Kevin Richardson would be playing on the drums and piano respectively.

Title and lyrical content

According to Entertainment Weekly editor David Browne, the album title is a nod to their two musical sides: Black (as in the R&B inflections of their upbeat tracks) and Blue (their inclination toward mushy crooning). It also represented Lou Pearlman's abuse and bruises. Browne wrote that "The Call" (a dance-pop song) "tells how to cheat on your mate by telling her your cell phone battery's low!, but it also has the blowsy feel of a rejected show tune". Rolling Stones Barry Walters called it "the album's most frenzied cut". The second track "Shape of My Heart" was described by Browne as a "predictable ballad", while AllMusic's editor Stephen Thomas Erlewine wrote that "the song flows as gracefully as 'I Want It That Way', prove that the Backstreet Boys do teen pop ballads better than anyone." The third track "Get Another Boyfriend" uses "drama-crazed harmonies" and was described by Walters as "the album's most frenzied cut". Erlewine wrote that the track is a "dead ringer for 'It's Gonna Be Me' crossed with 'Baby One More Time'". Walters wrote that "not even R&B kingpin Rodney "Darkchild" Jerkins can erase the Scandinavian sparkle from the fourth track "Shining Star".

Walters wrote that the sixth track "The Answer to Our Life", "bounces along on a perky melody obviously inspired by their Swedish mentors." The seventh track "Everyone" celebrate themselves and the power of their audience. Browne wrote that the song is "a clunky foot stomper, which continues the self congratulatory tradition of their earlier 'We've Got It Goin' On' and 'Larger than Life'." The eighth track, the ballad "More than That", was praised by critics. Entertainment Weekly praised "the graceful way their voices blend on the chorus", while Rolling Stone praised "the symphonic splendor of the track". The ninth track "Time" was written by the band members. Browne called it "piffle", while Walters said that "could've sprung from any substandard Nashville jinglemeister". The tenth track "Not for Me" received positive reviews. Browne praised "the spunky way they vault into the track". Browne wrote that "Time" & the 11th track "Yes I Will" appeared to be vying in a contest for "Next Big Wedding Song", but still acknowledged "the suave manner in which they engage in their trademark vocal swapping track" on the latter song. The 12th track, "It's True", is another ballad in the same vein of the others, while the last track "How Did I Fall in Love with You" is sung by Howie D and Brian Littrell while the rest of the group does background.

Critical reception

Upon its release, Black & Blue received generally favorable reviews from music critics, with an aggregate score of 61/100 from Metacritic.

Stephen Thomas Erlewine opined that "what gives Black & Blue character is that it's clear that the Backstreets want to remain kings of their world. So, the ballads are smoother than ever, and their dance numbers hit harder, all in an attempt to keep their throne." Billboard staff wrote that "Beyond ballads, Black & Blue crackles with funk-inflected uptempo ditties that are notable for their rough edges." Barry Walters of Rolling Stone stated that "the Boys still harmonize as well as the faceless background singers who prop up lesser pop puppets." Q wrote that "The sound has changed little, and the level of emoting none. Still, thunderous grooves such as 'Everyone' and 'Shining Star' continue to be virtually irresistible, while the quieter moments, including the hit single 'Shape of My Heart' will wow the ladies and the more sensitive gents for a while yet." CDNow labeled it "unquestionably the most seamless boy band release of the year."

David Browne wrote for Entertainment Weekly that "Black & Blue merely maintains a holding pattern, recycling their past and doing little to establish a firm future." Rebecca Dien-Johns of Yahoo! Music wrote that "Unfortunately, over a third of the songs on this album are ballads, and most of them are fillers at that." Natalie Nichols of Los Angeles Times compared the album to a pinball machine and said that "listening to these 13 songs is a bit like pinging around inside one of those old-fashioned amusement devices. Giant grinding beats slam you from pole to pole, there are lots of flashy effects, the environment is completely artificial, and once the ball is launched, you can see exactly where it's going." Robert Christgau gave the album a "dud" rating in his Consumer Guide.

Commercial performance
Black & Blue debuted at number-one on the US Billboard 200 after selling 1.6 million copies in its first week at retail in the US. The feat made them the first act in history to achieve sales more than a million copies in the first week with back-to-back releases. In its second week, the album held the number-one spot, selling an additional 689,000 copies. On December 18, 2000, the album was certified eight times platinum by the Recording Industry Association of America for shipments of over eight million copies in the United States. As of March 2015, the album sold 5,936,000 copies in the US according to Nielsen Music. It also sold 992,000 units at the BMG Music Club as of February 2003.

Internationally, the album recorded the best sales in a week for an album in history by selling over 5 million copies in its first week of sales.

Track listing

Notes
  signifies a remixer
  signifies an additional producer

Personnel
Credits for Black & Blue adapted from AllMusic and album's liner notes.

Backstreet Boys
 Nick Carter
 Howie Dorough
 Brian Littrell
 AJ McLean
 Kevin Richardson

Additional personnel

 Jamie Allen – assistant engineer 
 Timmy Allen – arrangements 
 John Amatiello – assistant engineer , Pro Tools engineer , XBS optical vocal enhancer engineer 
 Alan Armitage – engineer 
 Keith Armstrong – assistant engineer 
 Babyface – keyboards, drum programming, guitar, and background vocals 
 Adam Barber – engineer 
 Tony Battaglia – acoustic guitars 
 Kyle Bess – assistant mixing engineer 
 Stefan Boman – vocal engineer 
 Paul Boutin – engineer 
 Randy Bowland – guitar 
 Jimmy Bralower – additional drum programming 
 Bob Brown – engineer 
 Larry "Rock" Campbell – instrumentation 
 Tom Coyne – mastering
 Toby Dearborn – assistant engineer , assistant vocal engineer 
 Howie Dorough – additional vocal and musical arrangements 
 Nathan East – bass 
 Dona Kay Flint – string contractor 
 Paul Foley – engineer 
 Fraciz – mixing 
 Nick Gamma – art direction
 Jon Gass – mixing 
 Johan Gunnarsson – engineer, assistant mix engineer, and strings engineer 
 Mick Guzauski – mixing 
 Chris Haggerty – digital editing
 Charles L. Infante – set design
 Henrik Janson – guitar , string arrangements and conducting 
 Ulf Janson – string arrangements and conducting 
 Rodney Jerkins – instrumentation 
 John Katalenic – orchestration , piano and string arrangements 
 David Krueger – engineer , keyboards and programming , arrangements and additional programming 
 L.A. East Studio String Orchestra – orchestra 
 LePont – mixing 
 Thomas Lindberg – bass 
 Bernard Löhr – mixing 
 Gustave Lund – percussion 
 Kristian Lundin – engineer and mixing 
 Per Magnusson – engineer, keyboards, and programming ; arrangements 
 Max Martin – engineer and mixing , guitars , instrumentation 
 Charles McCrorey – assistant mix engineer 
 Scott McMahon – hair stylist, make-up
 Jackie Murphy – art direction
 Mads Nilsen – mixing 
 Björn Norén – assistant strings engineer 
 Esbjörn Öhrwall – guitars 
 Paul Oliveira – assistant mix engineer 
 Flip Osman – Pro Tools editing and assistant mix engineer 
 Edward Quesada – assistant engineer 
 Rami – engineer and mixing , instrumentation 
 Chris Resig – photography
 Veit Renn – arrangements , string arrangements 
 Rachel Zoe Rosenzweig – stylist
 Kyle Scholler – assistant engineer 
 Jake Schulze – engineer and mixing 
 Dexter Simmons – mixing 
 Ivy Skoff – production coordinator 
 George Spatta – engineer 
 Stockholm Session Strings – strings 
 Shane Stoneback – assistant engineer and assistant mix engineer 
 Peter Svensson – guitars 
 Leeza Taylor – photography
 Michael Thompson – guitar 
 Randy Thornton – conductor 
 Chris Trevett – engineer , mixing 
 Michael Tucker – vocal engineer 
 Clayton Wariner – second string engineer 
 Dirk Woodruff – string engineer 
 Marcelo Zolessi – assistant engineer

Charts

Weekly charts

Year-end charts

Certifications and sales

See also
 List of best-selling albums
 List of fastest-selling albums

References

Notes

2000 albums
Backstreet Boys albums
Jive Records albums
Albums produced by Rami Yacoub
Albums produced by Max Martin
Albums produced by Rodney Jerkins
Albums produced by Kristian Lundin
Albums produced by Babyface (musician)
Albums produced by David Kreuger
Albums produced by Per Magnusson
Albums recorded at Cheiron Studios
Albums recorded at Polar Studios